Sweet Sixteen is an album by Royal Trux, released in 1997. It is their only album not released as an LP. The album is the second of the band's trilogy paying homage to the music of the 1960s, 1970s, and 1980s.

Virgin Records was so upset with the album that it paid Royal Trux around $300,000 in order to terminate their recording contract.

Critical reception
Spin described the album as "lots of '70s dirtbag boogie, guitar noodling, and barroom jamathons." Trouser Press wrote: "A compromise between the (relatively) straight-ahead rock structures of their Virgin debut and the mayhem preceding it, Sweet Sixteen still reveals moments of genius embedded in the mess of guitars, death-rattle vocals and tortured synthesizers." The Chicago Reader wrote that Sweet Sixteen is "as grossly unlistenable as Twin Infinitives but lacks that album's surreal queerness, with the gruesome twosome and this year's rhythm section spitting up half-baked boogie tunes that all seem to break down." Entertainment Weekly called the album "seriously warped, ’70s-style stoner rock."

Track listing

References

External links
 

1997 albums
Royal Trux albums
Virgin Records albums
Charisma Records albums